The Republic of Honduras has had a considerable number of constitutional codes through its history.

Constitutions 

During the pre-independence period the province of Honduras was governed under the 1808 Constitution of Bayonne.
 Constitution of 1812  (Constitution of Cádiz), valid from 1812 to 1814 and from 1820 to 1823
 Bases of Federal Constitution of 1823, valid 1823 to 1824
 1824 Constitution of the Federal Republic of Central America

Constitution as State of Honduras 
 Constitution of the State of Honduras of 1825
 Constitution of the State of Honduras of 1831
 Constitution of the State of Honduras of 1839
 Constitution of Honduras of 1848

Constitutions as Republic of Honduras 
 Constitution of Honduras of 1865
 Constitution of Honduras of 1873
 Constitution of Honduras of 1880
 Constitution of Honduras of 1894
 Constitution of Honduras of 1904
 Constitution of the Federal Republic of Centroamérica of 1921
 Constitution of Honduras of 1924
 Constitution of Honduras of 1936
 Constitution of Honduras of 1957
 Constitution of Honduras of 1965
 Constitution of Honduras of 1982

Codes  
Honduran law belongs to the family of the Rights romanistas, derived from Common law. Initially it was formed by norms of Indigenous law and of Castillan law. Its codification was initiated by the liberal governments from the decade of 1880.

Civil law 
 Siete Partidas (Seven-part Code) of Don Alfonso X the Wise
 Civil code of Honduras of 1880
 Civil code of Honduras of 1899
 Civil code of Honduras of 1906

Penal law 
 Siete Partidas of Alfonso X of Castile
 Penal code of Honduras of 1880
 Penal code of Honduras of 1899
 Penal code of Honduras of 1895
 Penal code of Honduras of 1906
 Penal code of Honduras of 1984

Civil procedural law 
 Siete Partidas of Don Alfonso X the Wise
 Code of Civil Procedures of Honduras of 1881
 Code of Procedures of Honduras of 1899
 Code of Procedures of Honduras of 1906
 Procedural code Civilian of Honduras of 2007

Penal procedural law 
 Siete Partidas of Don Alfonso X the Wise
 Code of Procedures of Honduras of 1899
 Code of Criminal Instruction of Honduras of 1904
 Penal Procedural code of Honduras of 1985
 Penal Procedural code of Honduras of 1999

Commercial law 
 Ordenanzas Of Bilbao (1793)
 Code of Trade of Honduras of 1880
 Code of Trade of Honduras of 1899
 Code of Trade of Honduras of 1940
 Code of Trade of Honduras of 1950

Labour law 
 Code of the Work of Honduras of 1959

Specific laws 
 Law of Organisation and Attributions of the Courts
 Law of the Social Insurance of Honduras

See also
 Politics of Honduras
 Honduras
 Elections in Honduras
 Primary elections in Honduras
 General elections in Honduras – Presidential
 Politics of Honduras
 Government of Honduras
 Supreme Court of Honduras
 National Congress of Honduras
 Constitution of Honduras
 Public Prosecutor's Office (Honduras)
 Executive branch of the government of Honduras
 President of Honduras

References
Schuster. Guide to the Law and Legal Literature of the Central American Republics. 1937.
William Sylvane Stokes. Honduras: An Area Study in Government. Greenwood Press.1974. Google Books
Henry V Besso (ed). A Guide to the Official Publications of the Other American Republics. No XIII: Honduras. Library of Congress. Washington.1947. Google Books.
Alvarez and Ramos. Guide to Legal Research in Honduras. NYU  Law. GlobalLex. 4.1 Legislation. 
Honduras. Guide to Law Online. Library of Congress.
Legislation in "Honduras". WorldLII.
Honduras: legislation: codes. Institute of Advanced Legal Studies.

Legal history of Honduras
Law of Honduras
History of Honduras
Honduras